Raw Edge is a 1956 American Western film directed by John Sherwood starring Rory Calhoun, Yvonne de Carlo, Mara Corday.

It marked the movie debut of John Gavin under the name "John Gilmore".

Plot

In 1842, before law and order has come to Oregon, a wealthy man named Montgomery makes the rules, including one that any unmarried woman must go with whichever man puts in a claim for her. (After all, there is a 1000:1 men to women ratio). After his wife Hannah is attacked by an unseen man in the barn, Montgomery uses the opportunity to blame his rival, Dan Kirby, and lynch him.

Dan's wife an Indian woman, Paca, races to the Montgomery ranch to enlist the help of his wife, Hannah to save her husband. Hannah and Paca return to the Kirby's ranch but are unable to prevent his murder on Montgomery's command.

Knowing she is about to become an unwilling free agent to any man that wants her, Paca makes a break for it with Hannah escorting her out of town as she attempts to return to her people. A half-dozen men see her leaving and give chase, hoping to claim the newly-minted widow as their own. Outside of town the women come upon Five Crows. Paca begs him to escort her to the tribe's chief. Five Crows is murdered by the chasing mob of "suitors" and Paca is claimed by a white man named Sile Doty, who forces her to return to his house as his property.

A stranger (Tex) rides arrives at the Montgomery ranch, asking for directions to Dan Kirby's  ranch. Hannah tells him where it is, but neglects to tell him Dan Kirby is dead. Tex arrives at the ranch only to find Kirby swinging from a rope. He heads into town and asks for work at the saloon. He's directed to Sile Doty's ranch, who is Montgomery's foreman.

When he arrives at the Doty ranch, he meets his former sister-in-law, Paca, who greets him by name. It is then that Tex is revealed to be Kirby's brother, a former Texas Ranger. She explains that she is now the property of Doty since once Kirby was murdered Doty claimed her. She begs Tex to get out of town, but he's bent on revenge.

Tex hangs out at the Montgomery ranch, waiting for him to return so he can avenge his innocent brother's death, after Montgomery leaves Hanna alone to survey some of his property. Tarp and his father are supposed to ride to the survey site to warn Montgomery that Tex is coming for him. As they realize the Indians are massing, and there's a good chance Montgomery will be killed, they decide to head to his ranch and claim Hannah. Both argue over who gets her.

Tarp, his father, and the town gambler descend on the Montgomery ranch in an effort to be the first to lay claim to her as the Indians gather to avenge Five Crow's death. As the men fight over her, Hannah ultimately realizes that Tarp Penny was the one who attacked her that night. Tex watches the scene unfold and ends up taking Hanna away for her own protection.

Meanwhile, Doty arrives with Paca at the survey site and warns Montgomery that Tex is waiting for him at his ranch and the Indians are out for blood. Montgomery tells Paca to talk to the chief and guarantee his freedom to return to his ranch where he will give them the man that murdered Five Crows; if she won't help, he'll have her killed. He plans to frame Tex instead. Paca returns to her tribe to talk to the chief.

Tarp kills the gambler, his father, (who also had designs on her) and wounds Hannah in the shoulder after chasing her and taking a shot at Tex. Tarp ends up in a shootout with Tex that turns into a violent fistfight after both run out of ammunition. Tex prevails when Tarp is accidentally impaled on a bison head's horns when it is knocked off the wall.

Montgomery is intercepted by an Indian party and taken to the chief. The chief promises to allow him to return to his ranch "after the ceremony."  His body is dragged back to his ranch and Paca (now wearing Indian garb) rides off with the tribe, having avenged her husband's death.

As Tex begins to ride away from the ranch, he turns and offers Hannah a chance to join him. She doesn't have to think twice, since the rest of the town's men will inevitably descend on the ranch like a cloud of locusts seeking her and her property.

Cast
 Rory Calhoun as Tex Kirby
 Yvonne De Carlo as Hannah Montgomery
 Mara Corday as Paca
 Neville Brand as Tarp Penny
 Rex Reason as John Randolph
 Emile Meyer as Pop Penny
 Herbert Rudley as Gerald Montgomery
 Robert J. Wilke as Sile Doty
 John Gavin as Dan Kirby (as John Gilmore)
 Gregg Barton as McKay
 Ed Fury as Whitey
 William Schallert as Missionary

Production
The film was based on an original story by William Kozlenko and James Benson Nablo. It was bought by Universal in December 1954. They assigned Albert Zugsmith to produce. Kozlenko was hired to write the script. By May 1955 Harry Essex was reported to be working on the script.

By October 1955 the lead roles had been assigned to Rory Calhoun and Yvonne de Carlo. This was De Carlo's first film at Universal, the studio where she had been a star, since 1951.

Filming took place in October 1955.

References

External links
 
 
 

1956 Western (genre) films
1956 films
American Western (genre) films
Universal Pictures films
1950s English-language films
1950s American films